Gaia Weiss (born 30 August 1991) is a French model and actress. Her filmography includes Mary Queen of Scots (2013), Vikings (2014–2015), Meander (2020), La Révolution (2020), and Shepherd (2021).

Early life
Weiss was born in Paris to parents Catherine and Alain Weiss. She has a brother named Auriel Weiss. Her Jewish paternal grandfather is the French-Alsatian chromotherapy co-developer and French Resistance member, Jean-Michel Weiss; her maternal side is Polish. She spent her childhood between France, England, and Poland. She speaks French, English, Polish, and Hebrew.

At age three, Weiss began taking ballet lessons. She was inspired to act by the West End productions her great uncle took her to see when she was living in London as a child, and started classes when she was seven. After finishing her baccalaureate, she attended the Cours Florent and the London Academy of Music and Dramatic Art (LAMDA).

Career
Weiss made her feature film debut in 2013 as Mary Fleming in Thomas Imbach's period drama Mary Queen of Scots and then played Béatrice Morel in the Italian drama White as Milk, Red as Blood. The following year, Weiss joined the recurring cast for the second and third seasons of the History series Vikings as Þorunn.

Weiss appeared in the mythology film The Legend of Hercules (2014), the French comedy Serial Teachers 2 (2015), the action film Overdrive (2017), and Gérard Jugnot's Accidental Family (2017). She also had a small role as Ippolita Sforza in the series Medici: Masters of Florence.

Weiss starred in the French horror film Meander and the British horror film Shepherd; the former earned her a number of genre accolades. She played Marianne in the Netflix alternative history series La Révolution. She appeared as Madame du Barry in the 2022 BBC and Canal+ series Marie Antoinette.

Filmography

Awards and nominations

References

External links

 
 
 
 

Living people
1991 births
21st-century French actresses
Actresses from Paris
Alumni of the London Academy of Music and Dramatic Art
French Ashkenazi Jews
French expatriates in England
French female models
French film actresses
French people of German-Jewish descent
French people of Polish descent
French television actresses
Jewish French actresses